Cheryl W. Thompson is an investigative correspondent for the National Public Radio and a former investigative reporter with  The Washington Post. She is also an associate professor of journalism at George Washington University.

In June 2018, Thompson was named the first African American president of Investigative Reporters and Editors (IRE) and re-elected in 2019 for a second term and won an unprecedented third term in 2020.   In 2011, an adaption of Thompson's story A Cop Killer’s Remorse won an regional Emmy Award.

References 

Living people
American investigative journalists
Year of birth missing (living people)